Barry Urbanski is an American retired ice hockey goaltender and coach who was one of three people awarded the NCAA Tournament MOP in 1960 and was named as the Division II National Coach of Year in 1974.

Career
Urbanski began attending Boston University in the fall of 1957 and joined the varsity team the following year. He played only in relief as a sophomore, but in his junior season Urbanski made a name for himself in the Terrier net. In 17 games he went 12–5 with some of the best numbers in the nation, helping BU receive a tournament berth for the first time in seven years. The Terriers weren't able to outscore Denver in the semifinal and fell 4–6. In the consolation game, BU and St. Lawrence produced a wild affair with the Terriers managing to finish on top 7–6. Urbanski was named as the tournament's top goaltender and was one of three players to share the Tournament Most Outstanding Player, the only time in history that the award was split (as of 2020).

Urbanski served as the team's starter in his senior season but he could not recapture the magic of 1960 and the Terriers ended up with a losing season. After graduating, Urbanski remained at BU to earn a Master's degree and then joined the staff of State Teachers' College at Salem in 1964. While at Salem, Urbanski coached the ice hockey team for 11 years and never had a losing record. Under his stewardship, the Vikings became a power in ECAC 2, playing in three conference tournaments over a four-year span. Urbanski's best season behind the bench came in 1974 when the team finished with a 21–3 record, for which he received the Edward Jeremiah Award as the best coach in either Division II or III.

Urbanski retired as coach after the 1975 season and he was inducted into the Salem State Athletic Hall of Fame in 1987.

Statistics

Regular season and playoffs

College head coaching record

Awards and honors

References

External links

Year of birth missing (living people)
Living people
American ice hockey goaltenders
Ice hockey coaches from Massachusetts
People from Danvers, Massachusetts
Sportspeople from Essex County, Massachusetts
Boston University Terriers men's ice hockey players
Ice hockey players from Massachusetts
Salem State Vikings men's ice hockey coaches